Berel may refer to:

Berel, Kazakhstan, village in Katonkaragay District

People with the given name

Berel Wein, American-born Orthodox rabbi, scholar, lecturer, and writer
Berel Lazar, Orthodox rabbi, one of two claimants to the title "Chief Rabbi of Russia"
Berel Soloveitchik, a leading Rosh Yeshiva ("head of the yeshiva") of the Brisk yeshivas in Jerusalem, Israel

See also
Beryl (disambiguation)